This list of bridges in Germany lists bridges of particular historical, scenic, architectural or engineering interest. Road and railway bridges, viaducts, aqueducts and footbridges are included.

Historical and architectural interest bridges

Major road and railway bridges 
This table presents the structures with spans greater than 200 meters (non-exhaustive list).

Notes and references 
 Notes

 

 Others references

See also 

 Transport in Germany
 Roads in Germany
 Rail transport in Germany
 Geography of Germany
 :de:Liste der längsten Straßenbrücken in Deutschland  - List of longest road bridges in Germany
 :de:Liste der längsten Eisenbahnbrücken in Deutschland  - List of longest railway bridges in Germany
 :de:Liste der höchsten Brücken in Deutschland  - List of highest bridges in Germany
 List of bridges by river: de:Alster, de:Danube, de:Elbe, de:Hinterrhein, de:Lahn, de:Main, de:Moselle, de:Neckar, de:Saale, de:Rhine, de:Ruhr, de:Vorderrhein, de:Wupper, de:Wied
 List of bridges by city: :de:Berlin, de:Bremerhaven, de:Eschweiler, de:Hamburg, de:Munich
 List of bridges by type: de:Moveable bridge
 List of bridges by period: de:historic Rhine bridges, de:medieval stone bridges

External links

Further reading 
Magazine
 
 
Books
 
 
 
 
 

Germany
 
Bridges
Bridges